Alexander James O'Connor (born 4 May 1998), known professionally as Rex Orange County, is an English singer, multi-instrumentalist and songwriter. O'Connor rose to prominence in 2017 following multiple features on Tyler, the Creator's Grammy-nominated album Flower Boy, including the single "Boredom". NPR Music journalist Zoë Jones has described O'Connor's music as "a bright blend of hip-hop, jazz, and bedroom pop”. 

Under the Rex Orange County moniker, O'Connor has released one mixtape, Bcos U Will Never B Free (2015), and three studio albums: Apricot Princess (2017), Pony (2019), and Who Cares? (2022). Both Pony and Who Cares? made the top 5 in the UK and US, and the latter topped the UK Albums Chart. O'Connor also released a live album, entitled Live at Radio City Music Hall, in 2020.

Early life and name origin
Alexander James O'Connor was born on 4 May 1998, to Nina and Phil O'Connor, a professional sports photographer. He grew up in the village of Grayshott, Hampshire near Haslemere. O'Connor's interest in music began at a young age. At age 5, O'Connor joined the choir at the school where his mother worked. He became a drummer and later taught himself piano.

The name Rex Orange County is based on a teacher-given nickname, "The OC", after his surname O'Connor.

Career

2014–2016: Early career and Bcos U Will Never B Free
At age 16, O'Connor began playing the guitar and started to produce his own music using Apple's Logic software. At this age, he also began attending the BRIT School where he studied drumming and was one of four percussionists in his year; the relative rareness of his primary instrument provided him with wide exposure to various projects of others in his school which he credits with exposing him to new music. 

On 4 September 2015, O'Connor self-released his debut album Bcos U Will Never B Free on SoundCloud and Bandcamp. Upon listening to the album, fellow English musician and producer Two Inch Punch got in touch with him, providing him with a management team. The two have continued to collaborate throughout O'Connor's career in the form of the tracks "UNO", "Best Friend", and "Untitled". The album also caught the attention of American rapper Tyler, the Creator, who sent him an email describing his enjoyment of the project. This led to him flying O'Connor out the following year to Los Angeles to collaborate on his album Flower Boy, with him co-writing and contributing vocals to the songs "Boredom" and "Foreword". On 17 November 2016, O'Connor released the single "UNO", a song Clash magazine described by writing, "The buoyant keyboard riff underpins a hypnotic half-spoken vocal, one that veers from topic to topic in a hazy burst of creative mania." On 25 January 2017, he released the single “Best Friend” (premiering on Apple Music's Beats 1 station), followed later in the year by the release of his second album Apricot Princess. His work was compared by Aimee Cliff of The Fader in 2017 to "other artsy, post-genre teen artists, such as Kevin Abstract or Steve Lacy".

2017–2018: Apricot Princess
O'Connor's first release following the success of Apricot Princess and Flower Boy was on 11 October 2017 with the single "Loving Is Easy", created in collaboration with the Dutch artist Benny Sings. On 16 April 2018, he performed the song in his television debut on The Tonight Show Starring Jimmy Fallon. On 31 May 2018, he released a cover of "You've Got a Friend in Me" in collaboration with Randy Newman, the creator of the song. He was also featured in Spotify's Rise Program. 

On 9 October 2018, O'Connor was scheduled to appear on the French television programme Quotidien, but refused to perform because it featured a sketch by comedian Alison Wheeler parodying the Ku Klux Klan, which he called "tasteless".

2019–2020: Pony
On 14 February 2019, O'Connor released the single "New House". Later that year on 12 September, he released "10/10"; the lead single from his third album Pony. Released on 25 October 2019, Pony was his first major-label album release through RCA Records. Review aggregator Metacritic gave the album a rating of 76/100 based on 11 professional reviews.

On 30 September 2020, O'Connor released an EP with recordings from his performance at Radio City Music Hall in New York City during his Pony tour titled Live at Radio City Music Hall alongside a documentary  released on YouTube. This documentary showed the events leading up to this performance as well as the early conclusion of the Pony tour due to the COVID-19 pandemic.

2020–present: Who Cares?
In October 2020, O'Connor confirmed that he was in the process of recording a fourth studio album titled Who Cares?. In January 2021, he liked a Tweet seemingly confirming that it would be released at some point later that year. However, this did not materialise. On 13 January 2022, he began officially teasing the album, sending out postcards containing a phone number that when called, a snippet of song would play. The album was released on 11 March 2022, and was his first to top the UK Albums Chart, entering ahead of Impera by Ghost.

In July 2022, O'Connor cancelled tour dates in Australia, New Zealand and Europe due to "unforeseen personal circumstances".

Artistry
Growing up, O'Connor listened to Queen, ABBA, Stevie Wonder, and American alternative artists like Weezer and Green Day. He cites these artists and others as core inspiration for his own music.

Personal life
In 2015, O'Connor began dating fellow British singer-songwriter Thea Morgan-Murrell (known professionally as Thea), having met while attending the BRIT School together. He sang about her in several of his songs, and they collaborated on the tracks "Sycamore Girl" and "Never Had the Balls". On 24 November 2020, he confirmed on Twitter that they were separated, tweeting "i am not in a relationship".

On 10 October 2022, O'Connor appeared in Southwark Crown Court and was charged with six counts of sexual assault of the same woman, alleged to have taken place in June 2021. He pleaded not guilty to all counts and was bailed, with a trial provisionally scheduled for 3 January 2023. A representative for O'Connor released a statement on his behalf which read: "Alex is shocked by the allegations, which he denies, and looks forward to clearing his name in court. He is unable to make any further comment because of the ongoing proceedings". On 22 December 2022, O'Connor released a statement saying all charges against him were dropped and the case was to be dismissed following an investigation by the Crown Prosecution Service. CCTV footage and a police interview with the complainant's partner – who was with her on the night in question – did not match her account, meaning the case did not meet the CPS's legal test for a prosecution.

Accolades
In January 2018, O'Connor came in second in the BBC Sound of 2018 award after Norwegian singer Sigrid.

Discography

 Bcos U Will Never B Free (2016)
 Apricot Princess (2017)
 Pony (2019)
 Who Cares? (2022)

References

External links
 
 

1998 births
Living people
21st-century British male singers
21st-century English singers
Bedroom pop musicians
British indie rock musicians
English hip hop musicians
English male singers
English pop musicians
Lo-fi musicians
Musicians from Hampshire